Charles Bernstein may refer to:

 Charles Bernstein (composer) (born 1943), American composer of film and television scores
 Charles Bernstein (poet) (born 1950), American poet, essayist, editor, and literary scholar